Peter "Son" Mannino (born February 17, 1984) is an American former professional ice hockey goaltender and current assistant coach for the Colorado College Tigers. He played six games in the National Hockey League for the New York Islanders, Atlanta Thrashers, and the Winnipeg Jets.

Playing career
As a youth, Mannino played in the 1998 Quebec International Pee-Wee Hockey Tournament with the Detroit Honeybaked minor ice hockey team.

Mannino later played as a goaltender for the University of Denver where he led the Pioneers to the 2005 NCAA Championship and Tri-City Storm of the United States Hockey League where he helped them win the Anderson Cup in 2004. On July 3, 2008, Mannino signed with the New York Islanders as an undrafted free agent. He earned a win in his first NHL start with the New York Islanders on March 15, 2009, a 4-2 victory against the Chicago Blackhawks.

On July 6, 2009, Mannino left the Islanders and signed a contract with the Atlanta Thrashers.

On January 12, 2012 Mannino was reassigned to the Chicago Express of the ECHL by his parent club the Winnipeg Jets. On March 2, 2012 Mannino was acquired by the Pirates via loan from the St. John's IceCaps. During the 2012–13 season, Mannino signed an AHL contract with the Manchester Monarchs, top affiliate of the Los Angeles Kings, he signed a one-year agreement on December 4, 2012. In 20 games with the Monarchs, Mannino posted 10 wins.

On July 24, 2013, Mannino remained in the AHL agreeing to a one-year contract with the Wilkes-Barre/Scranton Penguins.

A free agent into the 2014–15 season, Mannino initially signed with the Toledo Walleye before he was released to sign with fellow ECHL club the Kalamazoo Wings on October 24, 2014. After one games with the Wings, Mannino returned to the Portland Pirates of the AHL on a try-out contract on November 18, 2014. He was released by the Pirates after three games with the club and later signed for the remainder of the season with the Binghamton Senators on December 27, 2014.

On June 18, 2015, Mannino announced the conclusion of his professional career after seven seasons in accepting an assistant coaching position on the Chicago Steel of the USHL.

Coaching career

Chicago Steel
On June 18, 2015, Mannino was announced as an assistant coach for the Chicago Steel of USHL.

University of Nebraska at Omaha
On June 1, 2017, Mannino was hired as an assistant coach at UNO filling out the first staff of new head coach Mike Gabinet.

Miami (OH)
On March 29, 2018, Mannino was announced as the associate head coach at Miami.

On March 27, 2019, Mannino was elevated to interim head coach of Miami.

Des Moines Buccaneers
On June 4, 2019, Mannino was announced as head coach of the Des Moines Buccaneers. On July 28, 2020, the Des Moines Buccaneers announced Mannino was promoted to head coach and general manager. He left the team after the 2020–21 season to join the Colorado College Tigers men's ice hockey program as an assistant coach.

Career statistics

Awards and honors

References

External links
 

1984 births
Living people
American men's ice hockey goaltenders
Atlanta Thrashers players
Binghamton Senators players
Bridgeport Sound Tigers players
Chicago Express players
Chicago Wolves players
Denver Pioneers men's ice hockey players
Ice hockey players from Michigan
Kalamazoo Wings (ECHL) players
Manchester Monarchs (AHL) players
NCAA men's ice hockey national champions
New York Islanders players
People from Farmington Hills, Michigan
Portland Pirates players
St. John's IceCaps players
Tri-City Storm players
Undrafted National Hockey League players
Utah Grizzlies (ECHL) players
Wheeling Nailers players
Wilkes-Barre/Scranton Penguins players
Winnipeg Jets players